Zeba Islam Seraj is a Bangladeshi scientist known for her research in developing salt-tolerant rice varieties suitable for growth in the coastal areas of Bangladesh. She is currently a professor at the Department of Biochemistry and Molecular Biology, University of Dhaka.

Academic career

Seraj studied at the University of Dhaka, Bangladesh obtaining a B.Sc. in 1980. She completed her M.Sc. from the same university in 1982. She obtained her PhD in biochemistry from University of Glasgow in 1986 and went to University of Liverpool for post-doctoral work in the following year. After completing her post-doc., she joined the Department of Biochemistry and Molecular Biology, University of Dhaka in 1988. She became an associate professor in 1991 and later a professor in 1997 at the same university. She has been supervising plant biotechnology projects funded by foreign and local grants as a principal investigator since 1991. She is a visiting researcher with UT Austin since 2013

Research activities

Seraj has established a well-equipped plant biotechnology laboratory at the University of Dhaka. She has been a co-principal investigator in several projects, such as the Generation Challenge Program (GCP)—an initiative to use molecular biology to help boost agricultural production.
Seraj has not only worked on fine mapping of the major QTLs for salinity tolerance in Pokkali, but also characterized traditional rice landraces with the aim of finding genetic loci responsible for salt tolerance and applying markers linked to these loci to aid breeding programs for incorporation of salinity tolerance in rice. She also works on developing genetically modified rice varieties with improved salt tolerance suitable for growing in the coastal region of Bangladesh. She was the recipient of the PEER award (joint USAID-NSF initiative) for using next generation sequencing technologies to find the basis of salt tolerance of a rice landrace endemic to the Bangladesh coast, where University of Texas at Austin served as the host for collaborative work.

Seraj has been a visiting scientist in PBGB, IRRI (Constructs for salinity tolerance with Dr. John Bennett Jan-March 1998), PBGB & CSWS Division, IRRI (IRRI-PETRRA Bangladesh project on development of MV rice for the coastal wetlands of Bangladesh, June 11–29, 2002 and June 16–20, 2003), USDA research station at Beaumont, Texas, USA ( Aug. 4–16, 2003) and at the Department of Molecular, Cell and Developmental Biology, University of Texas, Austin, USA as Norman Borlaug Fellow (August 15-December 15, 2005). She has been honored with Visiting researcher status at University of Texas at Austin (October 2014-September, 2020). She was awarded the Annanya Award, 2017 for her scientific research. She was invited for a Tedx talk on how to save crops from sea level rise and salinity (Jan 16, 2018). She was featured in NHK TV, Japan in a talk on Science for Sustainable Earth in 2019.

Personal life
Zeba was married to Toufiq M Seraj, a Bangladeshi businessman who was the founder and managing director of Sheltech. They have two daughters.

Awards
 Anannya Top Ten Awards (2016)

References

External links
 Zeba Islam Seraj's lab website
 
 
url=http://sites.nationalacademies.org/PGA/PEER/PEERscience/PGA_084034

Academic staff of the University of Dhaka
Bangladeshi scientists
Biochemists
Biotechnologists
Molecular biologists
1958 births
Living people
Women biotechnologists